David Blatherwick  
(born 1960 in Toronto, Ontario) is a Canadian artist and educator.

Education
He received a Bachelor of Arts in design from Ryerson Polytechnical Institute in 1984, a Master of Fine Arts from Université du Québec à Montréal in 1989, and attended the Skowhegan School of Painting and Sculpture in Maine in 1990.  He is currently teaches at the University of Waterloo

Career
In 1986 he was part of the Hybrid Cultures exhibit at Oboro gallery that showed the affinities between the art movements of Mexico City and Montreal.  His first solo exhibition was in Montréal in 1988, and he has since been included in numerous museum exhibitions, including solo at the Art Gallery of Windsor, Robert McLaughlin Gallery, Musée national des beaux-arts du Québec, Taichung in Taiwan, Cité Internationale Universitaire de Paris, and the Mattress Factory in Pittsburgh, and as part of group exhibitions at galleries including Musée des Beaux-Arts de Nantes Metamorphose et Clônage, Musée d'art contemporain de Montréal, Power Plant in Toronto, Museo de Arte Moderno, and the Musée du Québec.  His paintings and video installations brought him national attention in the late 1990s, and in 2002 his work was included in the Biennale de Montreal.  In 2002 he became a member of Arte y Desarrollo, a group of development and experimental artists whose activities are centralized in rural Dominican Republic.  Blatherwick has been the subject of numerous reviews and publications.

He has been guest speaker at Mattress Factory, University of Lethbridge, Concordia University, National Taiwan University of Arts, Taipei National University of the Arts, University of Western Ontario, Musée national du beaux-arts du Québec, and Guelph University.

His work, through private sales or charity auctions, is held in numerous public and private collections, including Art Bank of Canada, Banque Nationale du Canada, Musée d'art contemporain de Montréal, and the Musée national des beaux-arts du Québec.  He has been the recipient of numerous awards and fellowships, including from the Skowhegan School of Painting and Sculpture, the Conseil des arts et des lettres du Québec, the Canada Council, the Pollock-Krasner Foundation, and the University of Windsor, and has published and contributed to several critical essays, and publications.

Work
His solo exhibition Cheese, Worms and the Holes in Everything, was presented at the Art Gallery of Windsor in 2007, Art Mûr gallery, in Montreal, and the Robert McLaughlin Gallery of Oshawa in 2008.  Its production was also included in many exhibitions and was immortalized in a catalog of the same name.  Initially interested in the potential for interconnectivity suggested by new media and the internet, Blatherwick evoked the immense complexity of these center-less networks in his paintings.  Later in his career, his interest shifted to the more perilous biological activity found in our own bodies.  "Fusing the technological and the biological in a single frame of reference, David Blatherwick has evolved his painting language while offering ample high-tech and organic eye candy to the viewer's hungry eye"   Consistent throughout his entire oeuvre is a fascination with all forms of seething, rampant life, with organic shapes that bring to mind intestines, stomachs, molecules and viruses.

Further reading
Vanguard by Vancouver Art Gallery
C Magazine by Canada Council, Canada Council for the Arts
Raw vision by Outsider Archive
The New York Times: Traveler's Guide to Art Museum Exhibitions 2004 by Alan Riding, Susan Mermelstein, Roberta Smith

References

External links
Official website
David Blatherwick at the Centre for Contemporary Canadian Art
David Blatherwick at Galerie Art Mûr, Montreal

1960 births
Living people
Artists from Toronto
Toronto Metropolitan University alumni
20th-century Canadian painters
Canadian male painters
21st-century Canadian painters
Canadian video artists
20th-century Canadian male artists
21st-century Canadian male artists
Members of the Royal Canadian Academy of Arts
Skowhegan School of Painting and Sculpture alumni